This is a list of characters for the British sitcom The Green Green Grass that has aired on BBC One since 9 September 2005.

The Green Green Grass centres on the fictional Boyce family and their employees, who live or work on Winterdown Farm in Shropshire. The household is led by Boycie and Marlene, as played by John Challis and Sue Holderness. They have one child, Tyler, as played by Jack Doolan. They employ four members of staff, Elgin, Bryan, Jed and Imelda Cakeworthy, as played by David Ross, Ivan Kaye, Peter Heppelthwaite and Ella Kenion.

Other regulars in the series include Beth as played by Lisa Diveney, Llewellyn as played by Alan David, Ray as played by Nigel Harrison and Sara as played by Samantha Sutherland. Dora as played by June Whitfield and The Driscoll Brothers as played by Roy Marsden and Christopher Ryan have all made three appearances in The Green Green Grass.

Principal cast durations

Winterdown Farm: residents and staff

Boycie

Herman Terrence Aubrey Boyce (John Challis) – An untrustworthy ex-used car salesman and elitist with a mocking laugh who likes to think of himself as above everyone else. Boycie made sporadic appearances in Only Fools and Horses before becoming a regular cast member from the fifth series onwards. He remains the same in The Green Green Grass.

For The Green Green Grass, the character of Boycie had to be made more sympathetic. He was also seen in a match of one-upmanship against Del Boy in Only Fools and Horses. Boycie had a major part in the second episode of the final trilogy of Only Fools and Horses; this allowed the character to expand on screen before taking the lead role in the spin-off series.

Marlene

Marlene (Sue Holderness) – Marlene was initially an unseen character in Only Fools and Horses, occasionally mentioned by her husband Boycie. However, her first appearance saw that she was a bubbly, slightly promiscuous woman whose passionate, and seemingly unattainable, desire to have a child provided one of the Only Fools and Horses sub-plots. She later matured and became a frequently seen character, as did Boycie. In total, she appeared in around twenty episodes, slightly fewer than the character of Boycie.

In The Green Green Grass she is exactly the same in all senses. Unlike Boycie, Marlene settles into her new surroundings with little problems and without changing herself. She also appears to enjoy country life as the series progresses. In the series two episode "Mother Earth", Marlene gives away all her clothes, as they were not environmentally friendly. Marlene also has an intense dislike of the Driscoll Brothers, as seen in both "Brothers and Sisters" and "Home Brew".

She loves her dog, Earl. Duke has obviously died since his last appearance in Only Fools and Horses; however, this hasn't been revealed within The Green Green Grass. She is also extremely proud of her son Tyler, even when he does something silly or awkward.

Tyler

Tyler (Jack Doolan) – The character of Tyler made several appearances in Only Fools and Horses, although he was portrayed by different actors. His similarity in looks to Del Boy has led to a continuation of a running joke. It has been speculated in both Only Fools and Horses and The Green Green Grass that Tyler might be the outcome of an affair between Marlene and Del.

Tyler has a girlfriend called Beth from the episode "Pillow Talk" to "The Special Relationship". He has a new girlfriend from the fourth series called Sara. She first appears in the episode "Calendar Boys". Tyler has no on-screen friends in the country. Tyler has appeared in nearly every episode of the series, except "Lust in Translation" and "I Done It My Way".

Elgin Sparrowhawk

Elgin (David Ross) – Elgin Sparrowhawk is the farm manager of Winterdown Farm. He is a creepy man, who is often able to ensure that his workload remains light, suggesting he is not quite as ignorant as he appears. He always carries his briefcase with a string shoulder strap around with him, to help remind people that he is still farm manager, even though it looks empty on occasions.

Elgin is married to his unseen wife, who apparently has a glass eye. He has said on occasions that she doesn't really like him, and at one point he started to have his mail redirected to Boycie's house just to ensure that she doesn't find out that he's still living there. He has shown deep affection towards his wife on many occasions, although he obviously lusts for Marlene.

The character of Elgin has many levels of personality. He has been known to display aspects of happiness, sorrow, respect and even love on occasions, although this may sometimes be towards people who do not love him back. Elgin has a sister who is mentioned only once in the first series. Elgin's house has been shown once since the show's debut in 2005; it was shown from the outside in the episode "The Path of True Love".

Bryan

Bryan (Ivan Kaye) – Bryan is the farm's herdsman. Bryan can be over emotional on occasions, especially when thinking about his ex-girlfriend Myrtle. In one particular episode, he states that she dumped him seven times, and every time he found exactly the same wedding ring in a second-hand shop.

Little else is known about the character besides the fact that he lives alone in a caravan on the outskirts of Winterdown Farm. In the episode "The Path of True Love", Jed is seen to come over to his caravan in a social fashion showing that this may be a frequent occurrence. He is shown to have a good working and social relationship with colleagues Elgin, Jed and Imelda however, his relationship with both Boycie and Marlene is not quite as close.

Bryan has been known to invite people into his caravan in a crisis such as Elgin being thrown out by his wife and Boycie being thrown out by Marlene. However, he has stayed at other people's houses such as when his caravan burns down and he is forced to stay at Boycie's manor house along with Elgin in the episode "But is it Art?"

Bryan's workload has been known to expand from herdsman to such jobs as chauffeur in "One Flew Over the Cuckoo Clock" to security guard in "Home Brew". The character of Bryan has settled down massively since the show's debut in 2005. The character of Myrtle, Bryan's ex-girlfriend, is mentioned frequently but is never seen.

Jed

Jed (Peter Heppelthwaite) – Jed is the farm's ploughman. He is renowned for having a family of five children. In the episode "Here's to You, Mrs Boyce", Jed's youngest child is seen on the front of a local newspaper.

Jed's workload has also been known to expand from ploughman to various other areas of expertise, such as in the episode "Home Brew" when he gets involved in Ye Potato Cyder business. He is also known for attempting to avoid his wife, such as in the episode "The Path of True Love" when he turns up unexpectedly, in the middle of the night, at Bryan's caravan after having a heated argument with his wife. Bryan just accepts this as a usual occurrence and lets him in.

Other than the details already specified, little else is known about Jed. He is also renowned for wearing his hat almost all the time. He even turns up at the disco wearing his best suit and his scruffy hat in "For Richer For Poorer".

Imelda Cakeworthy

Imelda (Ella Kenion) – Mrs Cakeworthy is The Grange's housecleaner. Various jokes have been made to her expense, referring to her lack of a work ethic. She has even on occasions been asked to lift her legs whilst Marlene does the hoovering. Boycie fires her in the episode "Bothered and Bewildered" after he catches her sitting around doing nothing. However, after some strange experiences he re-hires her – immediately, these experiences were set up by Marlene herself, possibly because she enjoys having something to do during the day, and someone to talk to while doing it.

Mrs Cakeworthy has a husband who has been seen on occasions, most notably in the 2006 Christmas special "From Here to Paternity". She has also been seen to hold séances within The Grange since "More Questions Than Answers". Mrs Cakeworthy is also said to have a dust intolerance.

Although she appears to have numerous eccentricities, namely her claim to possess paranormal powers – such as being able to talk to the dead – and her preference of using old local language in daily conversation, she is actually one of the most level-headed characters amongst the local population.

Her husband, Colin, is in and out of hospital almost every series and thus she appears to be under pressure on occasions however, her responsibilities are sometimes thrown to one side much to other peoples' disgust. She is sometimes selfish and oblivious to other peoples problems.

Regulars

Llewellyn

Llewellyn (Alan David) – Llewellyn is Boycie's Welsh next-door neighbour. Boycie continually refers to him as a mad Welshman, in reference to his eccentric behaviour and Welsh nationalist views. He has been known to be self-centred and puts his needs before others. In the episode "Testing Times", he reported Boycie for using Artificial Fertiliser on his Organic Farm. This could have put Boycie in prison for up to five years. Llewellyn has a daughter called Rhian, who is Tyler's English teacher. Rhian has appeared in two episodes.

Llewellyn has been known to get a little out of his own depth, such as when he challenged Boycie to a pub quiz in More Questions Than Answers and lost ten thousand pounds that he didn't have in the first place. He has also accused Boycie of things that he hasn't done, such as in From Here To Paternity when Boycie's dog, Earl, supposedly made Llewellyn's 'slapper of a dog' pregnant, which Earl didn't.

Beth

Bethany (Lisa Diveney) – Beth is Tyler's Welsh girlfriend until the end of the third series. She is intelligent, pretty and a practicing vegetarian, but also intolerant of people who do not share her views. In the episode "Mother Earth," Beth's patience with Tyler and the family was put to its ultimate test. Among other things, she got upset with Tyler's lack of interest in her horse-racing protests and his decision to choose eating meat over a relationship with her, and is later traumatised when she peers through the window of their home to see Boycie completely naked, thanks to Earl.

Beth made her last appearance in the 2007 Christmas special, "The Special Relationship". It later turns out that Tyler had dumped her. The role of Tyler's girlfriend passed on to Sara from the fourth series. Beth was written out of the series, but is still mentioned frequently. She is said to have gone to Cambridge to further her education. This angers Tyler, as he is jealous of her achievements. However, Beth's dad Ray enjoys boasting about his daughter's achievements to him.

Sara

Sara (Samantha Sutherland) – Sara is Tyler's current girlfriend. She is attractive and dull-witted, and one of the few fans of Tyler's band, Puddle of Agony. Tyler eventually asked her out in the episode "Your Cheating Art", after some help from his mum and Dora. Tyler even managed to get her to strip naked for a piece of artwork. The character made two appearances in the series.

Ray

Ray (Nigel Harrison) – Ray is Beth's father and landlord of the local pub. Ray hates Tyler, as he believes that his daughter could have done better. He first appeared in the episode "Testing Times" and appeared in another ten episodes since. He is known for temper tantrums in extreme circumstances, such as the misunderstanding in From Here to Paternity, when he thinks that Boycie is calling his daughter 'a bitch' and when he says 'take a close look – it's a dog'. Ray also uses Blackmail on Boycie. Saying that if Tyler stops seeing Beth, he would show a humiliating photo of Boycie to everyone. Ray is good friends with Llewellyn, as the two share a Welsh heritage and nationalist leanings.

The Driscoll Brothers

Danny and Tony (Roy Marsden and Christopher Ryan) – First seen in "Little Problems" in Only Fools and Horses, the brothers cause Boycie to make a drastic escape to the countryside in an attempt to avoid them. They appeared in the 2005 Christmas Special, "One Flew Over the Cuckoo Clock" but they did not manage to kill him. They made their third ever appearance in "Brothers and Sisters" when they finally found Boycie and made him a deal. They made their latest appearance in the series four episode, "Home Brew" which aired on 15 January 2009.

Dora Lane

Dora Lane (June Whitfield) – Dora first appeared in The Lonely Herdsman. Dora is Marlene's mother. She was first seen in "He Ain't Heavy He's my Uncle" an episode from Only Fools and Horses seventh series where she originally was played by Joan Geary. Dora appeared in an episode of the 2009 series.

Guest appearances

Pertunia Lane
Pertunia Lane (Paula Wilcox) – Marlene's sister. The Driscoll Brothers followed Pertunia to Winterdown Farm when she came to visit in "Brothers and Sisters".

Colin Cakeworthy
Colin (Paul Bown) – Appeared in "From Here to Paternity" in 2006. He is the husband of Imelda Cakeworthy. He is a hypochondriac, yet a reference made in "The Path of True Love" states that he has just had another operation, which contradicts the former statement.

Denzil
Denzil (Paul Barber) – Originally appearing as a regular in Only Fools and Horses, Denzil made a one-off appearance in "Keep On Running" – the first episode of The Green Green Grass. He brought news of the Driscoll Brothers' release, causing Boycie to sell his house and the Showroom so he could move immediately to the countryside.

Sid
Sid (Roy Heather) – Originally appearing as a regular in Only Fools and Horses, Sid appears in a cameo in The Green Green Grass. When Boycie rings up The Nag's Head to offer Rocky the 'Gay' Bull to Trigger as a joke, Sid answers the phone on the Nag's Head set.

Cliff Cooper
Cliff (George Wendt) – Appeared in Season 3's The Special Relationship". Cliff Cooper is an American who was stationed at Winterdown Farm during the 1970s when it was used as accommodation for a US Army base.

Fiona Bruce
Fiona Bruce appeared as herself in the episode "One Man's Junk".

See also
Only Fools and Horses
List of Only Fools and Horses episodes
The Green Green Grass
List of The Green Green Grass episodes

References

External links
BBC Comedy Guide entry for The Green Green Grass
British Sitcom Guide for The Green Green Grass
The Green Green Grass website
The Green Green Grass at Only Fools and Horses website

Characters
, Green Green Grass